"She's a Lady" is the second single from Underdog Alma Mater by American pop punk band Forever the Sickest Kids. It was released on July 14, 2008 as a single in the UK for the band's tour there. A limited edition 7" picture disc was also made and sold temporarily. "She's a Lady" was chosen to be the next US single after beating out songs "Hey Brittany" and "Believe Me, I'm Lying" in a poll conducted on the band's website.

A music video was also released, directed by Phil Ruland, Ryan Ruland and the band's drummer, Kyle Burns.

Track list

Radio Edit
"She's a Lady" (UK radio edit) – 3:42

iTunes Single
"She's a Lady" – 4:00
"Give and Take (remix)" – 2:21

Picture Disc
 Side 1 – "She's a Lady" – 4:00
 Side 2 – "Give and Take (remix)" – 2:21

Music video
The music video is intercut of scenes of the band at a party, performing the song, and showing a girl who meets with her boyfriend. At one point in the video, the song is stopped and the band is shown setting fire to a bag full of dog feces and leaving it on a man's porch as they knock on his door and run away. The man comes out and stomps it out with disgust, yelling to his wife, "Honey, those punks put a parcel of poo-poo on the porch!".

An older, previous music video of when the band first started out also exists. This version of the video goes through the same basic concept as its successor.

Another video was made that consists of live performances of the band performing the song in the United Kingdom.

External links
https://web.archive.org/web/20080619031309/http://www.umusic.co.uk/news/index.php?ID=1013
Forever The Sickest Kids on Myspace

References

Forever the Sickest Kids songs
2008 singles
2008 songs
Universal Motown Records singles